The 1959 NFL season was the 40th regular season of the National Football League.

Tragedy struck on October 11 as NFL Commissioner Bert Bell suffered a fatal heart attack at Philadelphia's Franklin Field while watching the Philadelphia Eagles and the Pittsburgh Steelers. He died at age 65 at the nearby university hospital. League Treasurer Austin Gunsel was named interim commissioner for the rest of the season.

The Chicago Cardinals played their final season in Chicago before relocating to St. Louis for the following season.

In the NFL Championship Game on December 27, the Baltimore Colts defeated the New York Giants for the second year in a row.

Draft
The 1959 NFL Draft was held on December 1, 1958, and January 21, 1959 at Philadelphia's Warwick Hotel. With the first pick, the Green Bay Packers selected quarterback Randy Duncan from the University of Iowa.

Conference races 
The NFL had six teams in each conference; each played a home-and-away game against the other five conference teams, and two games outside the conference.  The Bears and Cardinals, and the Redskins and Colts, faced each other in an interconference game each year, as they were close geographic rivals.

After the second week, when the 1–1–0 Giants had to share the Eastern Conference lead with all five of the other clubs, the Giants won seven of the next eight games to clinch the title in Week Ten.  In the Western Conference, the San Francisco 49ers, who had come close (1952, 1953, 1954, and 1957) several times since joining the NFL, were 6–1 and had a two-game lead over their closest rival, the 4–3 Colts.  In Week Nine, though, the 49ers lost in Baltimore, 45–14 (November 22) and they shared the lead at 6–3–0.  Two weeks later, San Francisco had the home field advantage when they faced the Colts for a rematch.  Baltimore won again, 34–14, and clinched the title the following week.

Final standings

NFL Championship Game

Baltimore 31, NY Giants 16 at Memorial Stadium in Baltimore, Maryland, on December 27.

Awards

Coaching changes
Green Bay Packers: Ray McLean was replaced by Vince Lombardi.
San Francisco 49ers: Frankie Albert was replaced by Red Hickey.
Washington Redskins: Joe Kuharich was replaced by Mike Nixon.

Stadium changes
 The Chicago Cardinals decided to not play at Comiskey Park this season, and instead hold four games at Soldier Field and two at Metropolitan Stadium in Bloomington, Minnesota

References 

 NFL Record and Fact Book
 NFL History 1951–1960 (Last accessed December 4, 2005)
 Total Football: The Official Encyclopedia of the National Football League

National Football League seasons